Lorenzo De Grazia (born 1 April 1995) is an Italian footballer who plays as a midfielder for Maltese club Floriana.

Club career
He made his Serie B debut for Ascoli on 2 April 2016 in a game against Perugia.

For 2019–20 season, he joined Modena.

On 5 October 2020 he signed a two-year contract with Ravenna.

On 30 September 2021, he joined to Piacenza.

On 11 January 2022, he returned to Teramo.

On 20 September 2022, De Grazia signed with Floriana in Malta.

References

External links
 

1995 births
Living people
People from Ascoli Piceno
Sportspeople from the Province of Ascoli Piceno
Footballers from Marche
Italian footballers
Association football midfielders
Serie B players
Serie C players
Serie D players
Ascoli Calcio 1898 F.C. players
S.S. Maceratese 1922 players
S.S. Teramo Calcio players
Modena F.C. players
Ravenna F.C. players
Piacenza Calcio 1919 players
Floriana F.C. players
Italian expatriate footballers
Expatriate footballers in Malta
Italian expatriate sportspeople in Malta